Dilley Independent School District is a public school district based in Dilley, Texas (USA).

Located in Frio County, a portion of the district extends into La Salle County.

In 2009, the school district was rated "academically acceptable" by the Texas Education Agency.

Schools
Dilley High School
Mary Harper Middle School
Dilley Elementary School

References

External links
 

School districts in Frio County, Texas
School districts in La Salle County, Texas